Partido Morazanista de Liberación Nacional was a leftist party in Honduras. PMLN was earlier known as Frente Morazanista para la Liberación de Honduras. FMLH had been formed as a break-away of PCMLH. FMLH was a clandestine politico-military organization. FMLH was, however, mainly based in exile in neighbouring Nicaragua. According to one source, FMLH had 300 fighters at its peak.

In 1992 PMLN joined with three other groups to form the Democratic Unification Party.

Defunct political parties in Honduras
Defunct socialist parties in North America
Political parties disestablished in 1992
1992 disestablishments in Honduras